The Barron Baronetcy, of Bellevue, in the County of Kilkenny was a title in the Baronetage of the United Kingdom. It was created on 12 October 1841 for Henry Winston Barron. He was a member of parliament and represented Waterford City several times. After the death of his only son, the second Baronet, a diplomat, the baronetcy became extinct.

Barron baronets, of Bellevue (1841)

Sir Henry Winston Barron, 1st Baronet (1795–1872)
Sir Henry Page Turner Barron, 2nd Baronet (1824–1900)

References

Baronetcies in the Baronetage of the United Kingdom
Extinct baronetcies in the Baronetage of the United Kingdom